KMBY-LD, virtual and UHF digital channel 19, is a low-powered television station licensed to Monterey, California, United States. The station is currently owned by Cocola Broadcasting after a sale from JB Broadcasting in early 2008.

The KMBY call sign is shared with an oldies station on 1240 AM and 95.9 FM in Monterey.

Digital channels
The station's digital signal is multiplexed:

The station's main channel affiliated with the MundoFox Network on August 7, 2012. In December 2010, Cocola and the Estrella TV network signed a deal to broadcast that network on 19.2; Estrella TV moved to Hearst KSBW-DT3 in 2015. TeleXitos is on 19.2.

Daystar is carried on DT3 and DT4 showed a simulcast of KMBY Radio since December 2018.

References

External links

Heroes & Icons affiliates
Daystar (TV network) affiliates
MBY-LD
Television channels and stations established in 1989
1989 establishments in California
Low-power television stations in the United States